Sir John Ashworth (born 27 November 1938) is a scientist and educationalist.

Education
He was educated at West Buckland School and Exeter College, Oxford.  He obtained a PhD degree in biochemistry at Leicester University and was a lecturer and reader there before taking up a post of foundation Professor of Biology at University of Essex in 1974. His scientific research at the time focused on developmental biology and cell differentiation, with a particular interest in the slime mold.

Career 
John Ashworth joined the UK government's Cabinet Office in 1976, where he acted as the chief scientific adviser to the government, initially on secondment, and then as an undersecretary in the Cabinet Office from 1979 to 1981. He became vice-chancellor at the University of Salford from 1981 to 1990, and then director of the London School of Economics from 1990 to 1996. 

He was a chairman of the British Library board 1996–2001, the Institute of Cancer Research (deputy chairman) 2003–07, and Barts and the London NHS Trust 2003–07.

He is a governor of the Ditchley Foundation and is chairman of the board of trustees at Richmond, The American International University in London, a private liberal arts and professional studies university based in Richmond upon Thames and Kensington.

Honours
Sir John was awarded an Honorary Doctor of Laws from the University of Leicester in 2005. He retired in 2007, and was awarded a knighthood for public services in the Queen's New Year Honours list 2008. He was made an Honorary Fellow of Exeter College, Oxford in 1983.

References

External links
Newsquest Essex Network
 Former LSE Director given Knighthood
Ditchley Foundation

Living people
English biochemists
English educational theorists
Alumni of Exeter College, Oxford
Alumni of the University of Leicester
People associated with the London School of Economics
Knights Bachelor
People educated at West Buckland School
1938 births
Chief Scientific Advisers to HM Government
Vice-Chancellors of the University of Salford
Honorary Fellows of the London School of Economics